Alonzo de Santa Cruz (or Alonso, Alfonso) (1505 – 1567) was a Spanish cartographer, mapmaker, instrument maker, historian and teacher. He was born about 1505, and died in November 1567. His maps were inventoried in 1572.

Alonzo de Santa Cruz was a renowned cartographer on the Consejo de Indias (Council of the Indies) and a cosmographer at the Casa de Contratación (House of Trade). There, he worked on the Padrón Real, a Spanish map documenting the discoveries in the New World.

Alonzo de Santa Cruz, described cosmography as a way of making a painting of the earth, "because (gra)phia is the same as painting and cosmos is world"

In 1530, Alonzo de Santa Cruz produced the first map of magnetic variations from true north. He believed it would be of use in finding the correct longitude. Alonso de Santa Cruz designed new nautical instruments, was interested in navigational methods, and wrote about John Cabot's method for finding longitude which made use of the declination of the sun, observed with the quadrant.

Alonzo also taught astronomy and cosmography in the court of Charles V. Alonzo then wrote a five-volume biography about Charles V which described some of the Spanish atrocities in the New World. This upset Charles' son, Phillip II, and so Phillip removed three chapters of the biography.

He also produced the Islario general de todas las islas del mundo (sometimes called the Islario General), a map and document describing the world's islands, at the request of King Philip II in 1542. He also continued Hernando del Pulgar's work titled, History of the Catholic Monarchs.

See also
History of Cartography

Further reading
Cuesta Domingo, Mariano. Alonso de Santa Cruz y su obra cosmográfica. Madrid: Consejo Superior de Investigaciones Científicas 1983.
Dahlgrn, E.W. Map of the World by Alonzo de Santa Cruz. Stockholm: Royal Printing Office 1892.
Lamb, Ursula. "The Spanish Cosmographic Juntas of the Sixteenth Century." Terrae Incognitae 6:51-62.
Pulido Rubio, José. El piloto mayor de la casa de contratación de Sevila. Seville: Tipógrafo Zarzuela 1923.

References

1505 births
1572 deaths
Spanish cartographers
16th-century cartographers
16th-century Spanish people
Spanish exploration in the Age of Discovery